Gary Spencer Millidge (born 1961) is a British comic book creator best known for his series Strangehaven. He has also written and contributed to books about comics.

Biography

In 1995 Millidge began his Strangehaven series and in the same month published a short Strangehaven story in the comics anthology Negative Burn.

Millidge also writes about comics, editing Alan Moore: Portrait of an Extraordinary Gentleman and Alan Moore: Storyteller as well as writing Comic Book Design.

Bibliography

Comics
Comics work includes:

Strangehaven #1- (script and art, Abiogenesis Press, 1995-) collected as:
Arcadia (collects #1-6, foreword by Dave Sim, 2001 )
Brotherhood (collects #7-12, foreword by Bryan Talbot, 2001 )
Conspiracies (collects #13-18, foreword by Dave Gibbons, 2005 )
 "Strangehaven: Custard Creams" (script and art, in Negative Burn #24, Caliber Comics, 1995)
 "From Hell and Back" (script and art, in Bart Simpson's Treehouse of Horror #9, Bongo Comics, 2003)

Non-fiction
 Alan Moore: Portrait of an Extraordinary Gentleman (edited by Gary Spencer Millidge and Smoky Man, 352 pages, Abiogenesis, December 2003)
Comic Book Design: The Essential Guide to Creating Great Comics and Graphic Novels (160 pages, Random House, July 2009)
Alan Moore: Storyteller (336 pages, ILEX, August 2011)

Awards
As well as numerous nominations, including one for the 1997 "Talent Deserving of Wider Recognition" Eisner Award, he won the 1997 "Best Self-Published/Independent Comic" National Comics Award for Strangehaven.

Alan Moore: Portrait of an Extraordinary Gentleman was also nominated for the 2003 Bram Stoker Award for Best Non-Fiction.

Notes

References

External links

Blog
Gary Spencer Millidge at ComicSpace

Living people
British comics writers
British comics artists
1961 births